George Francis Stewart PC (1 November 1851 – 12 August 1928) was an Irish land agent and public servant.

Stewart was born at Gortleitragh House, County Dublin, the son of James Robert Stewart, a wealthy land agent, and Martha Warren, daughter of the eminent barrister Richard Benson Warren, and granddaughter of Sir Robert Warren, 1st Baronet, the head of a leading landowning family from County Cork. The prominent missionary Robert Warren Stewart, who was murdered in China in 1895, was his elder brother.

He was educated at Marlborough College and Trinity College, Dublin, graduating in 1872. He set up in business as a land agent in County Leitrim and acquired extensive interests. He was chairman of the Irish branch of the Surveyors' Institute and later of the institute itself and of the Land Agents' Association. In 1919 he was appointed Governor of the Bank of Ireland. He was a Unionist member of the Irish Convention, and served as the Vice-Chairman of the Irish Unionist Alliance. Stewart was appointed to the Privy Council for Ireland in the 1921 Birthday Honours, entitling him to the style "The Right Honourable".

He married Georgiana Lavinia Quin, daughter of Richard Quin of Torquay, in 1881. They had four children.

Footnotes

References
Obituary, The Times, 13 August 1928

1851 births
1928 deaths
Alumni of Trinity College Dublin
Businesspeople from County Dublin
Irish bankers
Irish Unionist Party politicians
Members of the Privy Council of Ireland
People educated at Marlborough College